The Freedom Aviation Phoenix was a single-engine four-seat American airplane that was sold as a homebuilt composite canard aircraft.

The kit was produced at a facility on St. Lucie County International Airport at Ft. Pierce, Florida.

Design and development
The Phoenix airframe was formed of carbon-fiber composite materials on factory molds.  The aircraft was assembled as a homebuilt, with a factory-sponsored builder-assist program available.

The aircraft has a swept, dihedral canard mounted ahead of the cabin, and a swept main lifting surface. Each wing has a fin (with full-length rudder) mounted about midway to the tip. In addition, the wingtips have swept winglets, which provide additional yaw stability while decreasing induced drag.

The Phoenix is powered by a six-cylinder horizontally-opposed piston engine driving a pusher propeller. The tricycle landing gear is retractable.

Only one aircraft was ever built, and the company has since gone out of business.

Specifications (Phoenix)

External links
 Manufacturer's website via archive.org

2000s United States civil utility aircraft
Homebuilt aircraft
Canard aircraft
Phoenix
Single-engined pusher aircraft
Aircraft first flown in 2007